Chioselia is a commune in Cantemir District, Moldova. It is composed of two villages, Chioselia and Țărăncuța.

References

Communes of Cantemir District